Bellevue Range Rear Lighthouse is a lighthouse in Delaware,
United States, on the mouth of the Christina River on the Delaware River, Wilmington, Delaware

History 
The Bellevue Range Rear Lighthouse is a pyramidal skeletal light tower built in 1909 on the grounds of a landfill. It was operated by resident keepers from 1909 until 1934 when it was automated.  The Bellevue Range Rear light was deactivated in 2001 when the landfill grew too high to see the light, and a modern tower was built to replace it.  The modern tower is an active aid to navigation. The Bellevue Range Rear Light is not open to the public.

It was listed on the National Register of Historic Places in 2006.

Head keepers
 William E. Spicer (1909 – 1911)
 Linwood Spicer (1911 – at least 1917)
 William H. Johnson (1919 – 1938)

See also

 List of lighthouses in Delaware
 List of lighthouses in the United States

References

External links

Lighthouses completed in 1909
Lighthouses on the National Register of Historic Places in Delaware
Wilmington Riverfront
Buildings and structures in Wilmington, Delaware
Lighthouses in New Castle County, Delaware
National Register of Historic Places in Wilmington, Delaware
1909 establishments in Delaware